The 2018–19 season is K-Electric's 105th competitive season, 105th consecutive season in the top flight of Pakistani football, 10th consecutive season in the Pakistan Premier League since gaining promotion from Football Federation League in 2006 and 105th year in existence as a football club.

Club

Coaching staff
{|class="wikitable"
|-
!Position
!Staff
|-
|Manager|| Mujtaba Hussain
|-
|rowspan="2"|Assistant manager|| Saeed Sr.
|-
| Muhammad Essa
|-
|rowspan="2"|Local coach|| Imran Khan
|-
| Shahbaz Khan
|-

Other information

First team squad

Season

National Challenge Cup

K-Electric were placed in group H with two second division teams, including runners-up Sui Northern Gas and Asia Ghee Mills. K-Electric finished last in their group after losing 1-0 to Sui Northern Gas and drew 0-0 to Asia Ghee Mills.

Table

Matches

Premier League

Tables

Matches

Statistics

Appearances

Top scorers

Summary

Summary

References

K-Electric F.C.
K-Electric
Football clubs in Pakistan